Martijanec is a Croatian village and municipality in Varaždin County.

According to the 2011 census, there are 3,843 inhabitants in the municipality, in the following settlements:
 Čičkovina, population 206
 Gornji Martijanec, population 44
 Hrastovljan, population 410
 Križovljan, population 288
 Madaraševec, population 204
 Martijanec, population 423
 Poljanec, population 716
 Rivalno, population 51
 Slanje, population 512
 Sudovčina, population 360
 Vrbanovec, population 629

References

Municipalities of Croatia
Populated places in Varaždin County